Larisa Semyonovna Latynina (née Diriy, Дирий; born 27 December 1934) is a former Soviet artistic gymnast. Between 1956 and 1964 she won 14 individual Olympic medals and four team medals. She holds the record for the most Olympic gold medals by a gymnast, male or female, with 9. Her total of 18 Olympic medals was a record for 48 years. She held the record for individual event medals, winning 14 over 52 years.  She is credited with helping to establish the Soviet Union as a dominant force in gymnastics.

Early life
She was born as Larisa Semyonovna Diriy in the Ukrainian SSR. Her father, Semyon Andreyevich Diriy, left the family when she was 11 months old, and she was raised by her illiterate mother, who worked as a cleaner during the day, and as a watchman during the night. Her father was killed at the Battle of Stalingrad, where he served as a machine gun operator. She first practiced ballet, but turned to gymnastics after her choreographer moved out of Kherson. She graduated from high school in 1953, and moved to Kyiv. She attended the Lenin Polytechnic Institute, and continued her training at the Burevestnik VSS. At the age of 19, she debuted internationally at the 1954 Rome World Championships, winning the gold medal in the team competition.

Gymnastics career 

In 1956, at the age of 21, Latynina made her Olympic debut at the Melbourne Olympic Games. In the all-around event, she fought off stiff competition to win gold. She finished first in the vault, second in the uneven bars and in the exercise on the floor and fourth in the balancing beam. She also led the Soviet Union in Team Event to victory.

After a very successful World Championships in 1958 (winning five out of six titles despite competing whilst four months pregnant and medaling in every event), Latynina was the favorite for the 1960 Summer Olympics in Rome. In the all-around event, she led the Soviet Union to take the first four places, thereby also securing a win in the team competition by a margin of nine points. Latynina defended her floor title, took silver medals in the balance beam and uneven bars events, and bronze in the vault competition.

Latynina won all-around titles at the 1962 World Championships, beating Věra Čáslavská of Czechoslovakia. Still the defending World Champion at the 1964 Summer Olympics, she was beaten by Čáslavská in the all-around competition. Latynina added two more gold medals to her tally, winning the team event and the floor event both for the third time in a row. A silver medal and two bronzes in the other apparatus events brought her total of Olympic medals to eighteen—nine gold medals, five silver, and four bronze. She won a medal in every event in which she competed, except for the 1956 balance beam where she came in fourth.

Latynina's nine gold medals make her second on the list of most Olympic gold medalists. She held the distinction of having more Olympic medals (either individually or with a team) than anybody, from 1964 until 2012. She is the only woman to have won nine gold medals. She is also the only female athlete who at some point has held the record for most Olympic gold medals. Additionally, within the sport of gymnastics, she is the only woman who has won an all-around medal in more than two Olympiads, the only woman who has won an individual event (floor exercise) in more than two Olympiads, and one of only three women who have won every individual event at either the World Championship or Olympic level. She is the only female gymnast to have twice won team gold, all-around gold, and an event final gold at the same Olympics, having done so in 1956 and four years later, in 1960.

Family
She was born to Pelageya Anisimovna Barabamyuk (1902–1975) and Semyon Andreevich Diriy (1906–1943), who died in the Battle of Stalingrad. Larisa was married three times. Her current husband is Yuri Izrailovich Feldman (b. 1938), a member of the Russian Academy of Electrotechnical Sciences and a former competitive cyclist. Her daughter from a former marriage, Tatyana Ivanovna Latynina (b. 1958), is a folk dancer. She was born only five months after her mother won a world all-around title, and seven months after her birth Latynina competed at the national championships. Latynina kept her pregnancy a secret, even from her coach. She also had a son.

Retirement
Latynina retired after the 1966 World Championships and became a coach for the Soviet national gymnastics team, a position she held until 1977. Under her coaching the Soviet women team won gold in the 1968, 1972 and 1976 Olympics. She organized the gymnastics competition at the 1980 Olympic Games in Moscow.

She holds the Russian citizenship and lives in Moscow. Latynina has received numerous Soviet and Russian state accolades.

In 2023, she spoke out against Russian athletes competing under a neutral flag at the Olympics due to the 2022 Russian invasion of Ukraine, calling it "unpatriotic".

Awards and honors
1989: Olympic Order (silver), International Olympic Committee
1998: Inducted into the International Gymnastics Hall of Fame

Competitive history

See also

 List of multiple Olympic gold medalists
 List of multiple Olympic gold medalists at a single Games
 List of multiple Olympic medalists at a single Games
 List of multiple Summer Olympic medalists
 List of top Olympic gymnastics medalists
 List of top medalists at the World Artistic Gymnastics Championships
 List of Olympic female gymnasts for the Soviet Union
 List of women who won medals in every event at the World Artistic Gymnastics Championships

References

Bibliography

External links
 
 
 
 
 
 
 Gymn Forum: Complete list of Latynina's competitive results
 Life Magazine images
 Larisa Latynina's profile in the Modern Museum of Sports includes photos of her and some of her decorations 

|-

|-

1934 births
Living people
Sportspeople from Kherson
Soviet female artistic gymnasts
Olympic medalists in gymnastics
Olympic gold medalists for the Soviet Union
Olympic silver medalists for the Soviet Union
Olympic bronze medalists for the Soviet Union
Olympic gymnasts of the Soviet Union
Gymnasts at the 1956 Summer Olympics
Gymnasts at the 1960 Summer Olympics
Gymnasts at the 1964 Summer Olympics
World champion gymnasts
Medalists at the World Artistic Gymnastics Championships
European champions in gymnastics
Burevestnik (sports society) athletes
Recipients of the Order "For Merit to the Fatherland", 2nd class
Recipients of the Order "For Merit to the Fatherland", 3rd class
Medalists at the 1964 Summer Olympics
Medalists at the 1960 Summer Olympics
Medalists at the 1956 Summer Olympics
Universiade medalists in gymnastics
Universiade gold medalists for the Soviet Union
Medalists at the 1963 Summer Universiade